Woodrow Wilson House may refer to:

Woodrow Wilson Birthplace, Staunton, VA, listed on the NRHP in Virginia
Woodrow Wilson Boyhood Home, Augusta, GA, listed on the NRHP in Georgia
Woodrow Wilson House (Washington, D.C.), home after Wilson's presidency, a National Historic Landmark, and listed on the NRHP in Washington, D.C.